Smārde Parish is an administrative unit of Tukums Municipality in the Courland region of Latvia.

Towns, villages and settlements of Smārde parish 

Parishes of Latvia
Tukums Municipality
Courland